Rangitikei by-election may refer to several by-elections in the history of the Rangitikei electorate.
Rangitikei by-election, 1865
Rangitikei by-election, 1868
Rangitikei by-election, 1875
Rangitikei by-election, 1880
Rangitikei by-election, 1892
Rangitikei by-election, 1909
Rangitikei by-election, 1978